Syllitus cylindricus is a species of beetle in the family Cerambycidae. It was described by Germain in 1899.

References

Stenoderini
Beetles described in 1899